Lecanipa is a genus of flies in the family Tachinidae.

Species
Lecanipa bicincta (Meigen, 1824)
Lecanipa leucomelas (Meigen, 1824)

References

Exoristinae
Tachinidae genera
Taxa named by Camillo Rondani
Diptera of Europe